Envy is an emotion which occurs when a person lacks another's quality, skill, achievement, or possession and either desires it or wishes that the other lacked it.

Aristotle defined envy as pain at the sight of another's good fortune, stirred by "those who have what we ought to have". Bertrand Russell said that envy was one of the most potent causes of unhappiness. Recent research considered the conditions under which it occurs, how people deal with it, and whether it can inspire people to emulate those they envy.

Types of envy 
Some languages, such as Dutch, distinguish between "benign envy" (benijden in Dutch) and "malicious envy" (afgunst), pointing to the possibility that there are two subtypes of envy. Research shows that malicious envy is an unpleasant emotion that causes the envious person to want to bring down the better-off even at their own cost, while benign envy involves recognition of other's being better-off, but causes the person to aspire to be as good. Benign envy is still a negative emotion in the sense that it feels unpleasant. According to researchers, benign envy can provide emulation, improvement motivation, positive thoughts about the other person, and admiration. This type of envy, if dealt with correctly, can positively affect a person's future by motivating them to be a better person and to succeed.
There is some discussion on whether the subtypes should be seen as distinct forms of envy, as some argue that the action tendencies (to damage someone else's position for malicious envy and to improve one's own position for benign envy) are not part of how the emotion is defined, while others think action tendencies are an integral part of an emotion. Those that do not think subtypes of envy exist argue that the situation affects how envy leads to behavior; while those that do think subtypes exist think that the situation affects which subtype of envy is experienced.

Evolutionary role 

Following Charles Darwin's 1859 book advancing the theory of evolution by natural selection, his 1872 work, The Expression of the Emotions in Man and Animals advanced the theory that there has been an evolution of emotion which developed in animals for the survival value emotions offer. In 1998, neuroscientist Jaak Panksepp provided data demonstrating that mammalian species are equipped with brains capable of generating emotional experiences.  Subsequent research in the behavioral sciences have provided insights into emotions such as envy and their impact on cognition and behavior. For example, consistent with envy being a motivation, empirical research shows that envy concentrates cognitive resources, focusing the subject’s attention towards collecting information on the social target and enhancing the ability to recall such information. In primate research, Frans de Waal conducted long term research demonstrating that chimpanzees as well as distantly related primates such as brown capuchin monkeys have a finely honed sense of justice within their social group, and that the key emotion used to measure and regulate fair outcomes is envy.  De Waal’s research leads him to argue that without envy motivating our interest in making social comparisons, there would be no reason to care about fairness and justice.

Based on a model of evolved responses to those who are better off, Sznycer has argued that envy increases support for economic redistribution.

Regarding possessions or status 

Often, envy involves a motive to "outdo or undo the rival's advantages". In part, this type of envy may be based on materialistic possessions rather than psychological states. Basically, people find themselves experiencing an overwhelming emotion due to someone else owning or possessing desirable items that they do not. Feelings of envy in this situation would occur in the forms of emotional pain, a lack of self-worth, and a lowered self-esteem and well-being.

In Old Money, Nelson W. Aldrich Jr. states:

Overcoming 
Envy may negatively affect the closeness and satisfaction of relationships. Overcoming envy might be similar to dealing with other negative emotions (anger, resentment, etc.). Individuals experiencing anger often seek professional treatment (anger management) to help understand why they feel the way they do and how to cope. Subjects experiencing envy often have a skewed perception on how to achieve true happiness. By helping people to change these perceptions, they will be more able to understand the real meaning of fortune and satisfaction with what they do have. According to Lazarus, "coping is an integral feature of the emotion process". There are very few theories that emphasize the coping process for emotions as compared to the information available concerning the emotion itself.

There are numerous styles of coping, of which there has been a significant amount of research done; for example, avoidant versus approach. Coping with envy can be similar to coping with anger. The issue must be addressed cognitively in order to work through the emotion. According to the research done by Salovey and Rodin (1988), "more effective strategies for reducing initial envy appear to be stimulus-focused rather than self-focused". Salovey and Rodin (1988) also suggest "self-bolstering (e.g., "thinking about my good qualities") may be an effective strategy for moderating these self-deprecating thoughts and muting negative affective reactions". Further research needs to be done in order to better understand envy, as well as to help people cope with this emotion.

Benefits 

Russell believed that envy may be a driving force behind the movement of economies and must be endured to achieve the "keep up with the Joneses" system. He believed this is what helps to maintain "democracy" as a system in which no one can achieve more than anyone else. Attended to, envy may inform a person about who they admire and what they want. Benign envy may lead a person to work harder to achieve more success.

In adolescence 

Children show evidence of envy at an early age. Adults can be just as envious; however, they tend to be better at concealing the emotion. Envy plays a significant role in the development of adolescents. Comparing oneself is a universal aspect of human nature. No matter the age or culture, social comparison happens all over the globe. Comparison can range from physical attributes, material possessions, and intelligence. However, children are more likely to envy over material objects such as shoes, video games, high value mobile phones, etc. Children believe these material objects are correlated to their status.

Social status has been found to have a strong connection with self-esteem.  An adolescent's self-esteem is very fragile during early years and is heavily impacted by peer opinion. If a child is comfortable with who they are and self-confident they are less likely to become envious of others' material objects, because they do not self-identify with materials. Material objects are not the only things that adolescents become envious over; however, it is the most prevalent.

As children get older they develop stronger non-materialistic envy such as romantic relationships, physical appearance, achievement, and popularity. Sometimes envious feelings are internalized in children, having a negative impact on their self-esteem. Envy comes from comparing; these comparisons can serve as a reminder that they have failed social norms and do not fit in with their peers. A feeling of inadequacy can arise and become destructive to a child's happiness and cause further internal damage.

A child's identity is formed during their early years. Identity development is considered the central task during adolescence. When children grow up understanding who they are, they are able to better define what their strengths and weaknesses are while comparing themselves to others. Comparison can have two outcomes: it can be healthy in aiding in self-improvement or it can be unhealthy and result in envy/jealousy which can develop into depression. This is why self-exploration and identity development are critical in adolescent years.

It is important to identify healthy and unhealthy envy in a child at an early age. If a child is showing signs of unhealthy envy, it is best to teach the child productive ways to handle these emotions. It is much easier to teach a child how to control their emotions while they are young rather than allowing them to develop a habit that is hard to break when they are older.

In adulthood 

The things that drive people mad with envy change throughout their lifetime. Studies have shown that the younger the person, the more likely they are to be envious of others. Adults under the age of 30 are more likely to experience envy compared to those 30 years and older. However, what people become envious over differs across adulthood.

Younger adults, under the age of 30, have been found to envy others' social status, relationships, and attractiveness. This starts to fade when a person hits their 30s. Typically, at this point in life, the person begins to accept who they are as an individual and compare themselves to others less often. However, they still envy others, just over different aspects in life, such as career or salary. Studies have shown a decrease in envy as a person ages; however, envious feelings over money was the only thing that consistently increased as a person got older. As a person ages, they begin to accept their social status. Nonetheless, envious feelings will be present throughout a person's life. It is up to the individual whether they will let these envious feelings motivate or destroy them.

In philosophy 
Aristotle, in Rhetoric, defined envy (φθόνος phthonos) as "the pain caused by the good fortune of others",  while Kant, in Metaphysics of Morals, defined it as "a reluctance to see our own well-being overshadowed by another's because the standard we use to see how well off we are is not the intrinsic worth of our own well-being but how it compares with that of others".

Religious views

In Buddhism 

In Buddhism, the term irshya is commonly translated as either envy or jealousy. Irshya is defined as a state of mind in which one is highly agitated to obtain wealth and honor for oneself, but unable to bear the excellence of others.

The term mudita (sympathetic joy) is defined as taking joy in the good fortune of others. This virtue is considered the antidote to envy and the opposite of schadenfreude.

In Christianity 
Both in the Old and New Testament there are various descriptions of envy and events related to it, mostly with a dramatic outcome.

Envy is one of the Seven deadly sins in Roman Catholicism. In the Book of Genesis envy is said to be the motivation behind Cain murdering his brother, Abel, as Cain envied Abel because God favored Abel's sacrifice over Cain's.

Envy is among the things that comes from the heart, defiling a person. The whole body is full of darkness when the eye, the lamp of body, is bad. "He who is glad at calamity will not go unpunished", said Solomon. Envy ruins the body's health, making bones rot and prohibiting the inheritance of the kingdom of God. Sometimes, as a punishment, people are left in their sins, falling prey to envy and other heavy sins.

Envy is credited within the Bible as the basis of all toil and skills of people. For example, mankind will choose occupations to gain wealth, fame and pleasures to equal or exceed their neighbors. Envy is, therefore, a sin deeply ingrained in human nature. It comes into being when man lacks certain things, a circumstance that exists when God is not approached for provision or when the provision is used for one's own selfish passions and pleasures.

Envy may be caused by wealth (Isaac, envied by the Philistines), by the brightness of wealth, power and beauty (The Kingdom of Assyria envied of other kingdoms), by political and military rising (Saul eyed David from the moment he heard the women song of joy), fertility (Leah, envied of Rachel), social ascent (Joseph whom his brothers were jealous of), countless miracles and healings (the apostles envied of high priest and the Sadducees), popularity (Paul and Barnabas, envied of unfaithful Jewish from Antioch), the success of Christianization of many Thessalonians (Paul and Silas, envied of unfaithful Jews from Thessalonica), virtues and true power to heal, to make miracles and to teach people (Jesus envied of the chief priests).

In the NT, Jewish Christians are admonished to not look with evil eye at the last converts ("Gentiles" or Pagan Christians) to avoid therefore becoming the last ones, missing the kingdom of God. They should be happy for anyone saved, like Christ, who came to save the lost, as the shepherd seeking the lost sheep. Zacchaeus, the chief tax collector, was among the lost ones and he succeeded in bringing salvation to him and to his house.

Sometimes arisen out of sophistry, Christians believe envy cannot coexist with true and spiritual wisdom, but with false, earthly, unspiritual, demonic wisdom.

Throwing away envy is a crucial condition in the path to salvation within Christianity. Envy was seen by the Apostle Paul as a real danger even within the first Christian communities. Envy is taught as a sin of the past, defeated by God's teaching, often referencing the tenth commandment, which forbids Christians from coveting their neighbor's things, woman, and servants, and urges them to rejoice with those who rejoice and weep with those who weep, as Apostle Paul said, and to love their neighbors as themselves. In 1 Corinthians, it states that brotherly, Christian love banishes definitively envy from one's heart.

In Hinduism 
"One who does not envy but is a compassionate friend to all... such a devotee is very dear to Me." - Lord Krishna in the Bhagavad Gita,

In Hinduism, envy is considered a disastrous emotion. Hinduism maintains that anything which causes the mind to lose balance with itself leads to misery. This concept is put forth in the epic Mahabharata, wherein Duryodhana launches the Kurukshetra war out of envy of the perceived prosperity of his cousins. He is known to have remarked:

"Father! The prosperity of the Pandavas (cousins) is burning me deeply! I cannot eat, sleep or live in the knowledge that they are better off than me!"

Thus, Hinduism teaches that envy can be overcome simply by recognizing that the man or woman who is the object of one's envy is merely enjoying the fruits of their past karmic actions and that one should not allow such devious emotions to take control of their mind, lest they suffer the same fate as the antagonists of the Mahabharata.

In Islam 
In Islam, envy (ḥasad حسد in Arabic) is an impurity of the heart and can destroy one's good deeds. The Qur’an compares envy with eating the flesh of one’s dead brother in verse 49:12:

يَـٰٓأَيُّهَا ٱلَّذِينَ ءَامَنُوا۟ ٱجْتَنِبُوا۟ كَثِيرًۭا مِّنَ ٱلظَّنِّ إِنَّ بَعْضَ ٱلظَّنِّ إِثْمٌۭ ۖ وَلَا تَجَسَّسُوا۟ وَلَا يَغْتَب بَّعْضُكُم بَعْضًا ۚ أَيُحِبُّ أَحَدُكُمْ أَن يَأْكُلَ لَحْمَ أَخِيهِ مَيْتًۭا فَكَرِهْتُمُوهُ ۚ وَٱتَّقُوا۟ ٱللَّهَ ۚ إِنَّ ٱللَّهَ تَوَّابٌۭ رَّحِيمٌۭ ١٢

O  believers! Avoid many suspicions, ˹for˺ indeed, some suspicions are sinful. And do not spy, nor backbite one another. Would any of you like to eat the flesh of their dead brother? You would despise that! And fear Allah. Surely Allah is ˹the˺ Accepter of Repentance, Most Merciful.

One must be content with what God has willed and believe in the justice of the creator. A Muslim should not allow his envy to inflict harm upon the envied person.  

Muhammad said, "Do not envy each other, do not hate each other, do not oppose each other, and do not cut relations, rather be servants of Allah as brothers. It is not permissible for a Muslim to disassociate from his brother for more than three days such that they meet and one ignores the other, and the best of them is the one who initiates the salaam." Sahih al-Bukhari [Eng. Trans. 8/58 no. 91], Sahih Muslim [Eng. Trans. 4/1360 no. 6205, 6210]

A Muslim may wish for himself a blessing like that which someone else has, without wanting it to be taken away from the other person. This is permissible and is not called ḥasad. Rather, it is called ghibṭa.

"There is to be no envy except in two cases: (towards) a person to whom Allah has granted wisdom, and who rules by this and teaches it to the people, and (towards) a person to whom Allah has granted wealth and property along with the power to spend it in the cause of the Truth." [Al-Bukhaari & Muslim]

In Judaism 
In Judaism (in the Hebrew Bible 'jealousy', is a key feature of God's personality – He is furious in jealousy (for His own people's undivided worship). YeHoVaH is jealous for His own. 
The God of Israel is, "slow to anger and great in compassion" (Exodus 34:6) but when His jealousy and anger had accumulated there was an outburst of punishment. (Exodus 34:6; Numbers 14:18; Psalm 103:8; Ps 86:15; Ps 145:8; Jonah 4:2; Nahum 1:3; Nehemiah 9:17; Joel 2:13 etc.)
While jealousy is branded as a negative and unwanted emotion generally in society today and also in Christianity, which had developed out of Judaism, in the Biblical (so-called Old Testament) context it is a strong aspect of God's character and therefore not a flawed characteristic – unlike envy, which God does denounce. (Exodus 20:14; Deuteronomy 5:9 and verse 18)

We envy people when we want what they have. We are jealous when we want to keep for ourselves what belongs exclusively to us. Therefore, we see the frightening permission God gave husbands who became jealous of their wives, to make them take a curse upon themselves, in case they had slept with another man while they belonged to their husband. (Numbers 5:11 – 31)

This points to the intimacy and exclusivity He is interested in, from His own people. Ephraim 'committed harlotry' against YHVH and thereby defiled the nation of Israel. Therefore, He withdrew Himself from them, to their detriment: "Woe to those when I depart from them!" (Hosea 9:12), He warns. "They will cry to YHVH, but he will hide His face from them". (Micah 3:4) A wounded Lover speaking. "You paid, but were not paid; for your harlotry. Therefore, oh harlot, hear the Word of YHVH: I shall set My jealousy against you and they will deal furiously with you." (Ezekiel 23:25)
YHVH showed Ezekiel how the people in Jerusalem set up 'an image that provokes jealousy'. (Ezekiel 8:11, 12, 1 Kings 14:22, 2 Chronicles 14:2)

God also loves like a jealous lover: He told Moses to make a breastplate for Aaron the priest, to wear when he goes into the Most Holy Place. On the breastplate he had to display the names of all the tribes of Israel, so He could see it whenever Aaron went in to work where YHVH's Presence was (Exodus 28:29). Somewhere else He says, I have your name engraved in the palm of My hand. (Isaiah 49:16)
The God of Israel wants with His people a marriage of faithfulness, fairness, kindness and compassion – and that they should know Him. (Hosea 2:21,22)

He is even jealous for the land itself, the land of Israel. (Joel 2:18) "I am jealous for Jerusalem and for Zion with a great jealousy.. YHVH will yet comfort Zion and will yet choose Jerusalem.. For I will be to her a wall of fire all around; and the glory in her midst." (Zechariah 1:14, 17, Zechariah 2:9)

The Hebrew Bible says Judah provoked YHVH to jealousy with all their sins and their false gods. (1 Kings 14:22) There is a notable difference in meaning between jealousy (of something that is one's own) and envy (which is covetousness of another one's possessions). (Exodus 20: 14; Proverbs 27:4)

Cultural references 
In English-speaking cultures, envy is often associated with the color green, as in "green with envy", and yellow.  Yellow is the color of ambivalence and contradiction; a color associated with optimism and amusement; but also with betrayal, duplicity, and jealousy. The phrase "green-eyed monster" refers to an individual whose current actions appear motivated by jealousy, not envy. This is based on a line from Shakespeare's Othello. Shakespeare mentions it also in The Merchant of Venice when Portia states: "How all the other passions fleet to air, as doubtful thoughts and rash embraced despair and shuddering fear and green-eyed jealousy!"

The character Envy from Fullmetal Alchemist series is one of the seven homunculi named after the seven deadly sins.

The character of Zelena on ABC's Once Upon a Time takes on the title "The Wicked Witch of the West" after envy itself dyes her skin in the episode "It's Not Easy Being Green".

In Nelson W. Aldrich Jr.'s Old Money, he states that people who suffer from a case of malicious envy are blind to what good things they already have, thinking they have nothing, causing them to feel emptiness and despair.

See also

References

Citations

Sources

Further reading 
 
 Epstein, Joseph. (2003) Envy: The seven deadly sins. New York, Oxford University Press.
 Salovey, P. (1991) The Psychology of Jealousy and Envy
 Schoeck, H. (1969) Envy: A theory of social behavior. New York: Harcourt, Brace and World.
 Smith, R.H. (2008) Envy: Theory and research. New York, Oxford University Press.
 Westhues, Kenneth (2004) The Envy of Excellence: Administrative Mobbing of High-Achieving Professors. Lewiston, New York: Edwin Mellen Press.
 Lindholm, Charles (2016) Generous Envy. Digital Development Debates, issue 17 "Sharing".

External links 

 http://plato.stanford.edu/entries/envy/ Stanford Encyclopedia of Philosophy entry

Emotions
Seven deadly sins
Social emotions